Vijay K. Chakravarthy is an Indian film cinematographer, known for his works predominantly in the Telugu cinema. He has worked for blockbusters like Bommarillu, Parugu, Mr. Perfect, and Nannaku Prematho.

He was nominated for the SIIMA Award for Best Cinematographer (Telugu), at the 1st SIIMA, for his work in Mr. Perfect.

Filmography

References

External links
Vijay K. Chakravathy - Internet Movie Database

Telugu film cinematographers
Living people
People from Dindigul district
Cinematographers from Tamil Nadu
Year of birth missing (living people)